The Căpitan Romano Mihail-class was a group of three armored motor launches of the Romanian Navy which served during the First World War and the Second World War.

Construction and specifications
The three boats were originally part of a larger class of eight vessels. The entire class was built at the Thames Iron Works in the United Kingdom between 1906 and 1907. Each boat measured 30 meters in length, with a beam of 4 meters and a draught of 0.8 meters. Normal displacement amounted to 45 tons, growing to 51 tons for a full load. Power plant consisted of two compound engines powering two shafts, generating 550 hp which resulted in a top speed of 18 knots. Each vessel could carry up to 7.6 tons of fuel. With a full complement of 20, each of the boats was armed with one 47 mm Skoda gun, one 6.5 mm Maxim machine gun and two spar torpedoes, as well as torpedo dropping gear amidships. The sides and deck were protected by bulletproof armor.

The thickness of their armor is not known, however it is known that during World War II the Germans used 20 mm-thick plates of armor to proof their landing craft against British 0.303 inches (~8 mm) caliber machine gun rounds, meaning that the armor of the Romanian vessels must have been around the same thickness.

Career
Initially, the eight vessels were classed as river torpedo boats, and served as such during the First World War. One boat was mined and sunk at the end of 1916. Ultimately, only three boats survived the Second World War. During their service, they showed considerable seaworthiness, as shown by their inclusion in the Soviet Black Sea Fleet in August 1944, instead of the Danube Flotilla (they would be returned to Romania in September 1945). This seaworthiness was also exploited by the Romanians, who fitted each of the three boats with one 300 mm depth charge thrower after the start of the Second World War. The names of the three boats were Căpitan Romano Mihail, Locotenent Călinescu Dimitrie and Maior Șonțu Ghoerghe. Of the initial class of eight vessels, these three were numbers 1, 3 and 4. Their 6.5 mm machine guns were also replaced by 20 mm autocannons.

References 

World War I naval ships of Romania
World War II naval ships of Romania
Ships built in London
World War II naval ships of the Soviet Union
Gunboats of the Romanian Naval Forces